GPM ("General Purpose Mouse") software provides support for mouse devices in Linux virtual consoles. It is included in most Linux distributions.

ncurses supports GPM; many applications use ncurses mouse-support.
Other applications that work with GPM include Midnight Commander, Emacs, and JED.

See also

 moused, a mouse-driver for FreeBSD

Sources

External links 

 
 

Free system software
Free software programmed in C
Linux software